Alcides Eduardo Bandera Rodríguez (born 5 February 1978) is a Uruguayan footballer.

External links
 El Grafico Profile 
 

1978 births
Living people
Uruguayan footballers
Uruguayan expatriate footballers
A.D. Isidro Metapán footballers
Atlético Balboa footballers
C.D. Atlético Marte footballers
Real Cartagena footballers
Expatriate footballers in Colombia
Expatriate footballers in El Salvador
Uruguayan expatriate sportspeople in Colombia
Uruguayan expatriate sportspeople in El Salvador
Association football forwards
Footballers from Paysandú